Kusti Gerhard Arhama (15 April 1885 – 20 May 1957; surname until 1935 Arffman) was a Finnish farmer and politician, born in Sotkamo. He was a Member of the Parliament of Finland from 1917 to 1930 and again from 1933 to 1945, representing the Agrarian League.

Early life
In the early 1900s, Arhama emigrated to the United States. He returned to Finland ten years later.

References

1885 births
1957 deaths
People from Sotkamo
People from Oulu Province (Grand Duchy of Finland)
Centre Party (Finland) politicians
Members of the Parliament of Finland (1917–19)
Members of the Parliament of Finland (1919–22)
Members of the Parliament of Finland (1922–24)
Members of the Parliament of Finland (1924–27)
Members of the Parliament of Finland (1927–29)
Members of the Parliament of Finland (1929–30)
Members of the Parliament of Finland (1933–36)
Members of the Parliament of Finland (1936–39)
Members of the Parliament of Finland (1939–45)
People of the Finnish Civil War (White side)
Finnish people of World War II
Finnish emigrants to the United States (1809–1917)